Khakhri is a village in Udaipur district in the state of Rajasthan India.

Villages in Udaipur district